The  is an official, secular ceremony conducted annually on August 15,  by the Japanese government at the Nippon Budokan in Tokyo, Japan. The ceremony is held to commemorate the victims of World War II. The first memorial ceremony was held on May 2, 1952.

Shūsen-kinenbi

Those events were:

August 14, 1945, the day the Imperial Japanese government gave notice to the Allies of World War II accepting the conditions of the Potsdam Declaration,
August 15, 1945, the day of the Shōwa surrender broadcast announcing to the people of Japan that the Imperial government had accepted the Potsdam Declaration, and unconditional surrender of the armed forces,
April 28, 1952, the San Francisco peace treaty with Japan came into force which under international law ended the state war with the Allied nations, and returned independence to Japan,

It is not an official holiday under Japanese law.

Overview
By decision of the Japanese Cabinet, on May 2, 1952 the Emperor and Empress of Japan held a memorial service for war dead in Shinjuku Gyoen. The next such service was held on March 28, 1959. In 1963 the date was moved to August 15, the day the  had aired in 1945. 

In the following year the service was held at Yasukuni Shrine, and in 1965 it was moved to the Budokan where it is still held today. In 1982 the Diet enacted a law fixing the date of the ceremony at August 15. The service is meant to honor both Japanese military casualties and civilian victims of war, over 30 million deceased individuals in total.

The event is organized by the Ministry of Health, Labour, and Welfare. The Emperor and Empress are always in attendance, as well as representatives of business, labor, political, and religious organisations, and bereaved families. Roughly 6,000 attendees were recorded in 2007.

The service is scheduled at 11:51am for one hour, and is broadcast by the Japan Broadcasting Corporation.

No invited leader has ever absented himself from the memorial, including those who have criticized visits to Yasukuni Shrine. There has never been a protest from foreign powers about the memorial.

Order of service
 Opening
 Entrance of Their Majesties the Emperor and Empress of Japan
 Anthem: Kimigayo
 Address by Prime Minister of Japan
 Moment of Silence (usually at noon)
 Address by His Majesty the Emperor
 Addresses by Speaker of the House of Representatives, Speaker of House of Councillors, Representative for the Bereaved
 Exit of Their Majesties the Emperor and Empress of Japan
 Offering of Flowers
 Closing

Notable events
 1988: The Shōwa Emperor, on his deathbed, is flown to the ceremony by helicopter.
 2006: During Yōhei Kōno's speech, an exceptionally clear reference was made to war responsibility.
 2007: Last ceremony with a surviving parent of a war victim in attendance.
 2009: Due to an irregular dissolution of the Diet, there was no Speaker of the House of Representatives.
 2011: The moment of silence was accidentally delayed by 26 seconds due to a long speech.

References

See also 
Surrender of Japan

World War II memorials in Japan
Cold War history of Japan
Recurring events established in 1952
1952 establishments in Japan